Danny Vera may refer to:

 Danny Vera (singer), Dutch singer-songwriter
 Danny Vera (footballer), Ecuadorian footballer